Sirajeddine Chihi (born 16 April 1970 in Hammam-Lif) is a retired Tunisian football player. He played most of his career for his hometown club CS Hammam-Lif and also for Espérance Tunis as a defensive midfielder.

He played for the Tunisia national football team and was a participant at the 1998 FIFA World Cup, starting in all three of Tunisia's matches.

International goals

References

External links

1970 births
Living people
Tunisian footballers
Tunisia international footballers
1998 FIFA World Cup players
1994 African Cup of Nations players
1998 African Cup of Nations players
2000 African Cup of Nations players
Tunisian Ligue Professionnelle 1 players
CS Hammam-Lif players
Espérance Sportive de Tunis players
Al Ahli Club (Dubai) players
EGS Gafsa players
UAE Pro League players
Tunisian expatriate footballers
Expatriate footballers in the United Arab Emirates
Association football midfielders